Nina Haver-Løseth (born 27 February 1989) is a retired Norwegian World Cup alpine ski racer and specializes in the technical events of slalom and giant slalom.

Haver-Løseth made her World Cup debut in February 2006, and her first podium came in a slalom race at Zagreb in January 2015. In January 2016, she gained her first World Cup win in a slalom at Santa Caterina, becoming the first Norwegian woman to win a World Cup slalom since Trine Bakke almost exactly sixteen years earlier.

At the 2007 World Championships in Sweden at Åre, Haver-Løseth was the top Norwegian female, with 30th in the giant slalom and tenth in the slalom.

Born in Ålesund, Møre og Romsdal, her sisters Lene and Mona Løseth are also alpine ski racers; she represents the Spjelkavik IL club.

World Cup results

Season standings

Race podiums
 2 wins – (1 SL, 1 CE)
 8 podiums – (4 SL, 2 GS, 2 CE)

World Championship results

Olympic results

References

External links

 
 Nina Haver-Loeseth World Cup standings at the International Ski Federation
 
 
 
  
 

1989 births
Norwegian female alpine skiers
Living people
Alpine skiers at the 2014 Winter Olympics
Alpine skiers at the 2018 Winter Olympics
Olympic alpine skiers of Norway
Medalists at the 2018 Winter Olympics
Olympic medalists in alpine skiing
Olympic bronze medalists for Norway
Sportspeople from Ålesund